Statistics of Moldovan National Division (soccer/football) for the 1995–96 season.

Overview
It was contested by 16 teams and Zimbru Chişinău won the championship.

League standings

Results

References
Moldova - List of final tables (RSSSF)

Moldovan Super Liga seasons
1995–96 in Moldovan football
Moldova